Happy School, situated in Darya Ganj, New Delhi, India, is a public co-ed school, the first co-ed school in Delhi, established by the late Shri Padam Chand Ji.

In 1933, an incident of an eight-year-old boy screaming that he would never go to school moved Shri Padam Chandji. He gave birth to the philosophy of Happy Education.

Happy School started with seven children in Chooriwalan (J.K. Happy School). In 1938, the Happy Teacher's Training Centre started and in 1953, the foundation of (Central) Happy School was laid in Darya Ganj. The school now has about 2000 students and 100 teachers.

The portals of the Secondary Wing of the school were opened in 1953, at Darya Ganj, in New Delhi.

The motto of the institute is "To grow physically, mentally, emotionally and intellectually the child must essentially be happy." - Shri Padam Chand (founder).

The Head of the school is Mrs. Ruby Vaid and the Director now is Mrs. Geeta Arora

Darya Ganj (opposite the Darya ganj kotwali), New Delhi - 110002

Activities and facilities 
 Library
 Computer Lab
 Anand Utsav : Annual arts and cultural festivals

Co-curricular activities

Sports 
These include badminton, table tennis, volleyball, basketball, chess, throwball, cricket, carrom, best in class equipments and 2hrs of playing

Cultural 
Music Room and an Activity Hall.

For kids 
 Play ground,
 Garden area

See also
Education in India
List of schools in India
List of schools in Delhi affiliated with CBSE

References

External links 
 Central Board of Secondary Education
 Govt. of NCT of Delhi
 Official website

Schools in Delhi
Educational institutions established in 1953
1953 establishments in India